The Clatskanie School District (6J) is a two-school public school district in Columbia County, Oregon, United States. It serves the city of Clatskanie and the surrounding area.

Demographics
In the 2009 school year, the district had 6 students classified as homeless by the Department of Education, or 0.7% of students in the district.

Schools
 Clatskanie Elementary School (CES) serves kindergarten through sixth grade students
 Clatskanie Middle/High School (CMHS) combines middle school and high school and serves seventh grade through twelfth grade.

At one time, there was a middle school and a high school, but they have merged into one school. The mascot for CMHS is the tigers, CES's mascot is the cougars, the former CMS mascot was the eagles.

References

External links
 
446 F.3d 964 Pinard v. Clatskanie School Dist., Ninth Circuit Court case

School districts in Oregon
Education in Columbia County, Oregon